This article presents the discography of American musician, singer, actor, and social activist, Harry Belafonte.

Albums

Studio albums

Live albums

Select compilations

Collaborations

Singles

Concert videos
Listen to the Man DVD

References

External links
 

Discographies of American artists
Folk music discographies
Pop music discographies